Vascular non-inflammatory molecule 2 is a protein that in humans is encoded by the VNN2 gene.

This gene product is a member of the Vanin family of proteins which share extensive sequence similarity with each other, and also with biotinidase. The family includes secreted and membrane-associated proteins, a few of which have been reported to participate in hematopoietic cell trafficking. No biotinidase activity has been demonstrated for any of the vanin proteins, however, they possess pantetheinase activity, which may play a role in oxidative-stress response. 

The encoded protein is a GPI-anchored cell surface molecule that plays a role in transendothelial migration of neutrophils. This gene lies in close proximity to, and in same transcriptional orientation as two other vanin genes on chromosome 6q23-q24. Two transcript variants encoding different isoforms have been described for this gene.

References

Further reading